William Press can refer to:

William H. Press, American astrophysicist and computer scientist
William Hans Press, American businessperson
William J. Press, British wrestler who competed at the 1908 Summer Olympics
Bill Press, American talk radio host